Chando Likhon is the first Santali film to be made on 35 mm released in 2001. Bengali film-maker Umesh Mardi and late actress Malho Mardi, who earned acclaim for her performance in Chando Likhon, were jointly honoured with the AISFA special award.

Cast

Prem Mardi
Aminshu Kisku
Malho Mardi
Camera - Dasrath Hansdah
Label - Gold Disc
Singer - Sawan Murmu, Geeta, Masang
Music - Chandan Baskey

References 

2001 films
2001 directorial debut films